"Body Talks" is a song by English rock band the Struts. It was released as the first single from their second studio album, Young & Dangerous. It was originally released on 15 June 2018 as the lead single from their album and was later re-released as a duet with American singer-songwriter Kesha on 28 August 2018. Both the solo and duet versions are included as the first and thirteenth track respectively on the Struts' album. The song was written by band members Luke Spiller and Adam Slack with producers Lauren Christy and John Levine.

Background
Lead singer, Luke Spiller discussed the background of the song in an interview on the Elvis Duran Show: "[Kesha] is a real rock and roller at heart really. When you talk to her about her music and stuff, she loves the Stones. She loves a lot of great British bands. So I think we naturally connected and she heard the song and that was it really."

Kesha also talked about the Struts and the song in a statement to Rolling Stone."They are one of my favorite current bands keeping the spirit of classic rock and roll alive with their wild energy and sexy style. It’s a song about my favorite activity: boogieing."

Music video
The music video for the Kesha duet was released on 28 August 2018. The video features the band playing the song while Spiller dances around a red backdrop with a cane and Kesha sits on a gold throne, shouting through a megaphone. The duo utilize a number of randomly painted props, including bananas, pyramids, roosters, skulls, ice cream cones and lollipops.
The music video for the non-duet version features the band in London on tour.

Commercial performance
The solo version of the song peaked at No. 12 on the Billboard US Alternative, #33 on  Billboard US Mainstream Rock and #15 on the Billboard Hot Rock Songs.

Live performances
The Struts and Kesha performed the song together for the first time on The Tonight Show Starring Jimmy Fallon on 15 November 2018.

The song was performed again together during a show in Atlantic City, New Jersey at the Ocean Resort on 16 November 2018.
The song was also performed at the Victoria's Secret Fashion Show at Pier 94 New York City on 8 November 2018

Charts

Weekly charts

Year-end charts

References

External links

Kesha songs
The Struts songs
2018 singles
Songs about dancing
2018 songs
Songs written by Lauren Christy
Songs written by Jon Levine